In the Night is a 1922 British-Dutch silent crime film directed by Frank Richardson.

Cast
 C. M. Hallard - The Stranger
 Dorothy Fane - Estelle
 Hayford Hobbs - George Stanton
 Adelqui Migliar - James Marston
 Gladys Jennings - Anne Marston
 Frank Dane - Inspector

External links 
 

1922 films
British silent feature films
Dutch silent feature films
British black-and-white films
Dutch black-and-white films
1922 crime films
British crime films
Dutch crime films
Films directed by Frank Richardson
1920s British films